Aramichthys is an extinct genus of prehistoric bony fish that lived during the middle division of the Eocene epoch.

References

Eocene fish
Prehistoric perciform genera